Jurita Šnitko (born 30 July 1976) is a Latvian luger. She competed in the women's singles event at the 1998 Winter Olympics.

References

1976 births
Living people
Latvian female lugers
Olympic lugers of Latvia
Lugers at the 1998 Winter Olympics
People from Sigulda